Audrey Vandervelden (born July 18, 1954 in Vancouver, British Columbia) is a retired volleyball player from Canada.

The 6ft 3in tall Vandervelden competed for her native country in two Summer Olympics: 1976 and 1984. A resident of Surrey, British Columbia she twice finished in 8th place with the Women's National Team.

References

Canadian Olympic Committee

1954 births
Living people
Sportspeople from Surrey, British Columbia
Canadian women's volleyball players
Canadian people of Dutch descent
Olympic volleyball players of Canada
Sportspeople from Vancouver
Volleyball players at the 1976 Summer Olympics
Volleyball players at the 1984 Summer Olympics